Fargoa gaudens is a species of sea snail, a marine gastropod mollusk in the family Pyramidellidae, the pyrams and their allies.

Description
The shell of this micromollusc grows to a length of 0.7 mm.

Distribution
This species occurs in the following locations:
 Gulf of Mexico from Louisiana to Texas.

References

External links
 To Encyclopedia of Life
 To World Register of Marine Species

Pyramidellidae
Gastropods described in 1993